Aldwine (died 737) was a medieval Bishop of Lichfield and Bishop of Leicester.

History
Around 721 Aldwine succeeded Headda as bishop of the Mercians; his see was at Lichfield. He held the see of Leicester at the same time as he was at Lichfield. Between the years 723 and 737, Aldwine witnessed a charter of Æthelbald of Mercia granting to the Earl Aethilric 20 hides of land to build the minster of St. Mary at Wootton Wawen. In June 731, he participated in the consecration of the Mercian abbot Tatwine as Archbishop of Canterbury.

Aldwine died in 737.

Notes

Citations

References

External links
 

737 deaths
8th-century English bishops
Bishops of Leicester (ancient)
Anglo-Saxon bishops of Lichfield
Year of birth unknown